Mikela Ristoski (born 7 November 1989) is a Paralympic athlete from Croatia who competes in T20 classification track and field jump events. She won bronze for Croatia at the 2012 Summer Paralympics in the long jump (F20). Ristoski is a multiple medalist at both World and European Championship levels, and has been World champion in both the long jump (2011) and triple jump (2015).

References

External links 
 

Paralympic athletes of Croatia
Paralympic medalists in athletics (track and field)
Athletes (track and field) at the 2012 Summer Paralympics
Athletes (track and field) at the 2016 Summer Paralympics
Athletes (track and field) at the 2020 Summer Paralympics
Paralympic gold medalists for Croatia
Paralympic bronze medalists for Croatia
1989 births
Living people
Medalists at the 2012 Summer Paralympics
Medalists at the 2016 Summer Paralympics
Medalists at the 2020 Summer Paralympics
People from Pula
Croatian female long jumpers
Croatian female triple jumpers
Croatian people of Macedonian descent